is an action-adventure hack and slash video game developed by feelplus. The game is an enhanced port of the 2007 Wii video game No More Heroes, originally developed by Grasshopper Manufacture and directed by Goichi Suda.

The game was released on PlayStation 3 and Xbox 360 in Japan on April 15, 2010 by Marvelous Entertainment. In North America and Europe, it was published by Konami in 2011 for the PlayStation 3, featuring support for the PlayStation Move, and various fixes to the game's performance and graphics.

A sequel, No More Heroes 2: Desperate Struggle was released on Wii months prior. No More Heroes III was announced at E3 2019 and released in 2021 for the Nintendo Switch.

Gameplay

In Heroes' Paradise, the player character, Travis Touchdown travels around on foot or his motorcycle in a free roaming world killing the top ten assassins in order to make the storyline progress. There are numerous part-time job side quests to earn money which can be spent on weapons, training sessions, clothes and video tapes.

Most attacks are performed using a standard control scheme, with certain other moves, including the "death blow" and sword lock struggles, executed by following on-screen instructions. The beam katana can also be upgraded and replaced throughout the game by visiting Dr. Naomi. While the katana does not follow the exact position of the remote, it is able to distinguish between a "high" and "low" position which varies the character stance and the attacks done. In addition to attacks with the beam katana, Travis can kick and punch, and when enemies are stunned, he can throw them with a number of professional wrestling maneuvers, which were previously done by manipulating both the Wii Remote and Nunchuk. Travis has a secondary mode, "Dark Side", that is accessed when three icons line up in a slot machine after a successful death blow.

Differences from No More Heroes
There have been several changes to the game from the original Wii version. The main differences between the two iterations are:
 High-definition graphics
 English (everywhere/Xbox 360/Red Zone) and Japanese (Non-Red Zone PS3 only) voice acting.
 An unlockable "Very Sweet" Mode, which depicts Sylvia Christel, Shinobu, Holly Summers, Bad Girl and Jeane wearing more "appealing" attire.
 Ability to stock up to three Dark Side mode charges, rather than having it activate immediately, like in the original.
 Unused Dark Side mode charges left over in the player's stock at the end of a Ranking Battle rewards Travis Touchdown with additional LB dollars (as was the case with unused Anarchy in the Galaxy stocks in the original version).
 The song, "Heavenly Star", by the Genki Rockets was removed. Same goes for the music video that players could watch in the motel room in the Japanese and European Wii versions.
 The Ubisoft trailer (which only appeared in the North American Wii version) on the TV with the full Helter Skelter fight and Sylvia Christel introduction explaining the rules of the UAA has been removed and exactly the same intro from the start of the game serves as the trailer.
 Sylvia's calls to Travis on his cell phone are now heard on screen because of the PS Move motion controller lacking a speaker (although the use of the Wii remote's speaker was optional).
 Ability to warp straight to any Side-Job or Assassin Mission once the player has beaten any of them at least once.
 A retry option was added to the Side-Jobs, Assassin Missions, and Free Fights. However, it only appears when the player has failed in either.
 Five new Side-Jobs were added: Signaling, Sign Spinning, Kitty Race, Bust A Coconut and People Bowling.
 Five new Assassin Missions were added; Guard Break, Power-Down Battle, Big Bang Anarchy, Shortcake Freaks and Crowded Train Carnage.
 Five extra bosses from No More Heroes 2: Desperate Struggle are available to fight at certain points in the game. These are Skelter Helter, Nathan Copeland, Kimmy Howell, Matt Helms and Alice Twilight.
 Players are now able to revisit Ranking Fights and cinematics from Travis' motel room armchair, in the form of nightmares and dreams.
 A "Score Attack" mode has been added that lets the player refight all 15 of the game's bosses and compete for a high score online. This is also the only way for players to refight all of the NMH2 extras as they don't appear in nightmare mode.
 More traffic and pedestrians in Santa Destroy.
The northern section of Santa Destroy was blocked off, with any collectibles and missions located in that area moved to the rest of the map.

PlayStation Move support

Unlike the original Japanese release of the game, the North American and European release of the game include PlayStation Move support at launch. This is the only difference between the PlayStation 3 and Xbox 360 versions of the game. Players can use the PlayStation Move controller to recharge the katana, since the beam katanas run on batteries, as well as control it to execute attacks and advanced combos, much like the Wii version.

Development
On November 17, 2009, Famitsu magazine revealed that No More Heroes would receive a port to both the PlayStation 3 and Xbox 360 from the company feelplus.

Shortly after the announcement of the game in November 2009, the North American and European publisher of the original, Ubisoft and Rising Star Games, announced that they would not be localizing the game. On June 28, 2010 Ignition Entertainment, when asked if they were publishing the game abroad, commented that they "were looking at it (but they) believe that another publisher will publish it." At Gamescom 2010 in August, Konami announced at their press conference that they were bringing only the PlayStation 3 version to North America and Europe in 2011 with added PlayStation Move support. A Press release was also given to provide additional information on the improvements made on the Western localization of the game. A North American release was formally announced on the PlayStation Blog by Jeff Reubenstein, formally unveiling the title's Move support as well as PS3 exclusivity.

When the game was released in Japan, the PlayStation 3 version of the game was censored similar to its Wii predecessor attaining a "D" rating from CERO which is equivalent to a "Mature" rating from ESRB while the Xbox 360 version of the game remained uncensored similar to the North American release of its Wii predecessor causing it to receive a "Z" rating equivalent to the "Adult Only" rating from ESRB. However, the North American and European PlayStation 3 release of the game are uncensored. The Japanese Red Zone Edition, which is based on the international release, is similarly uncensored and received a "Z" rating from CERO.

By pre-ordering from Amazon.co.jp, customers were awarded with bonus cards particular to each format of the game. PlayStation 3 owners were rewarded with the Cherry Card set, while Xbox 360 owners were rewarded with the Mango Card set. The cards featured semi-erotic poses from the female characters within the game.

Reception

No More Heroes: Heroes' Paradise received "mixed or average" reviews, according to review aggregator Metacritic.

IGN gave the game a 7.5 out of 10, praising the combat and updated visuals, but criticized the screen tearing and slowdowns, as well as the mini-games, calling them tedious. Destructoid said, "...sadly, some of the smaller details that made the original No More Heroes special are gone," citing the Wii Remote's speaker functionality, full soundtrack, and overall personality as the factors that made the Wii version superior. Eurogamer gave high praise to the game's over-the-top presentation and core gameplay but criticized the technical issues of the port, writing, "There's screen-tearing and...the various posters dotted through Santa Destroy have been defiantly embalmed in their original pixellated form, and the on-screen font when you're doing jobs has been irretrievably ruined...No More Heroes should look great in HD, and it kind of does, but the increased resolution also makes some of what was passable into flaws." Game Informer gave the game a 7.75 out of 10, praising the tongue-in-cheek presentation and PlayStation Move controls while being disappointed with its retainment of all the problems present in the original game. GamesRadar wrote positively about the game's large scope, unique gameplay, and soundtrack while panning the Move controls, Sixaxis support, and unimproved visuals. Push Square gave the title 8 stars out of 10, stating, "It is a shame there wasn’t just a little extra effort put into the Move support, but the Move provides a capable and enjoyable way to experience this murderous bloodbath through Santa Destroy."

Sales for the Japanese launch of Heroes' Paradise were slightly better than with the original Wii version. The PlayStation 3 and Xbox 360 versions of the game sold 16,000 and 15,000 units respectively in their first week on sale in the country.

Notes

References

External links
  
 No More Heroes: Red Zone 

2010 video games
Action-adventure games
Censored video games
Hack and slash games
Konami games
Feelplus games
No More Heroes (series)
PlayStation 3 games
PlayStation Move-compatible games
Single-player video games
Video game remakes
Video games set in California
Video games with cel-shaded animation
Xbox 360 games
Video games developed in Japan
AQ Interactive games